Kim Song-i (born 10 August 1994) is a North Korean table tennis player. As of November 2017, she is ranked 23rd in the world based on ITTF rankings.

Kim plays a highly defensive style with plenty of slice, occasionally injecting pace with top spin strokes from the forehand. She represents the Amrokkang Sports Club.

She won the bronze medal for North Korea at the 2016 Summer Olympics.

Early life
Kim was born on 10 August 1994 to a working-class family in Phyongchon District, Pyongyang. She went to the Ponghak Primary School and later the Sosong District Juvenile Sports School.

Career
In 2012 in Helsingborg she won the Women's Singles title at the Swedish Open.

2016 Rio Olympics
In the third round, she surprisingly beat Japan's Kasumi Ishikawa, ranked number six in the world.,  In the quarter finals, she went on to beat Singaporean Yu Mengyu, ranked 13th, with a score of 4-2 before losing to second-ranked Ding Ning in the semifinals with a score of 4–1. However, Kim was not an easy opponent for Ding, who was both stressed and exhausted after the match. In the bronze medal match, she beat Japan's Ai Fukuhara with a score of 4–1 to take the bronze medal of the 2016 Olympics.

References

North Korean female table tennis players
Table tennis players at the 2016 Summer Olympics
Olympic table tennis players of North Korea
1994 births
Living people
Asian Games medalists in table tennis
Table tennis players at the 2014 Asian Games
Table tennis players at the 2018 Asian Games
Asian Games silver medalists for North Korea
Asian Games bronze medalists for North Korea
Medalists at the 2014 Asian Games
Medalists at the 2018 Asian Games
Table tennis players at the 2010 Summer Youth Olympics
Olympic bronze medalists for North Korea
Olympic medalists in table tennis
Medalists at the 2016 Summer Olympics
Universiade medalists in table tennis
Universiade bronze medalists for North Korea
Medalists at the 2017 Summer Universiade
21st-century North Korean women